Paul Cairney (born 29 August 1987) is a Scottish footballer, who plays as a midfielder.

Cairney has previously played for Queen's Park, Partick Thistle, Hibernian, Kilmarnock, Stranraer, Ayr United,  Peterhead and Albion Rovers.

Career
Born in Glasgow, Cairney was registered with St Mirren as a youth player, but was released by the club aged 17. He then signed for amateur club Queen's Park and made his first senior appearance in December 2005. He began to play more frequently for the Spiders in the 2006–07 season and helped the club win promotion to the Second Division.

Cairney signed a three-year deal with Partick Thistle in 2008, but was loaned back to Queen's Park for six months. This loan was subsequently extended in January to the end of the 2008–09 season.

Cairney made his debut for Thistle in a Scottish Challenge Cup tie against Airdrie United, coming on as a substitute. His full and home debut came against Berwick Rangers in the Scottish League Cup. Cairney scored 12 goals for Thistle during the 2011–12 season, including a hat-trick in a 3–0 win against Dundee. He was nominated for player of the year in the 2011–12 Scottish First Division.

Cairney signed a two-year contract with Hibernian in July 2012. He scored his first goal for the club on 1 September, in a 2–2 draw against Celtic. Cairney struggled to consistently hold a place in the Hibernian first team due to injuries. He was released by the club at the end of the 2013–14 season.

Cairney signed a two-year contract with Kilmarnock in June 2014. After being released by Kilmarnock, Cairney signed for Scottish League One side Stranraer in July 2015, and after one season with the club, signed for recently promoted Ayr United. Cairney signed for Peterhead in July 2017. He left Peterhead after one season.

After two years out of football, Cairney signed for Albion Rovers in July 2020.

Career statistics

References

External links

Living people
1987 births
Scottish footballers
Scottish Football League players
Queen's Park F.C. players
Partick Thistle F.C. players
Hibernian F.C. players
St Mirren F.C. players
Kilmarnock F.C. players
Stranraer F.C. players
Ayr United F.C. players
Association football midfielders
Footballers from Glasgow
Scottish Premier League players
Scottish Professional Football League players
Peterhead F.C. players
Albion Rovers F.C. players